The California Education and Research Federation Network (CERFnet) is a mid-level network service provider based in California. CERFnet was one of the NSFNET regional networks and a co-founder of the Commercial Internet eXchange (CIX). The CERFnet network was founded in January 1988 by Susan Estrada of the San Diego Supercomputer Center (SDSC), received partial funding of $2.8 million by the National Science Foundation a year later, and was fully operational by November 1989, linking together 38 California research centers. The network was operated by the SDSC and General Atomics.

References

1988 establishments in California
American companies established in 1988
Companies based in California
Internet properties established in 1988
Internet service providers of the United States
Telecommunications companies of the United States